In mathematics, c-function may refer to:
Smooth function
Harish-Chandra's c-function in the theory of Lie groups
List of C functions for the programming language C